Jacquette Ada (born 27 August 1991) is a Cameroonian football forward, who last  played for  Ataşehir Belediyespor in the Turkish Women's Super League with jersey number 13. She is a member of  the Cameroon women's national team.

Club career 

She played before for the Cameroonian clubs Femina Stars d'Ebolowa and Lorema FC (women).

In September 2015, she signed with 1207 Antalya Muratpaşa Belediye Spor in Antalya, which was newly promoted to the Women's First League.

In the 2016–17 season, Ada transferred to the newly promoted Beşiktaş J.K.

Returned home, she played for the Guinness Super League club Eclair FC of SA. For the 2021–22 Turkish Super League season, she went to Turkey, again and signed a one-season contract with Fatih Vatan Spor in Istanbul. The next season, she transferred to Ataşehir Belediyespor. On 2 January 2023, she returned home.

International career 
She is a member of the Cameroonian national team.

Career statistics 
.

Honours 
Turkish Women's First League
Beşiktaş J.K.
Runners-up (2): 2016–17, 2017–18

References

External links

1991 births
Living people
People from South Region (Cameroon)
Cameroonian women's footballers
Women's association football forwards
Cameroon women's international footballers
Cameroonian expatriate women's footballers
Cameroonian expatriate sportspeople in Turkey
Expatriate women's footballers in Turkey
1207 Antalya Spor players
Beşiktaş J.K. women's football players
Amed S.K. (women) players
Turkish Women's Football Super League players
Fatih Vatan Spor players
Ataşehir Belediyespor players